APEC Philippines 1996 was a series of Asia-Pacific Economic Cooperation meetings focused on economic cooperation, held at the Subic Bay Freeport Zone in Subic, Zambales on 24–25 November 1996. It was the eighth APEC meeting in history and the first held in the Philippines.

Preparations
During the November 1994 APEC Summit in Indonesia, the Philippines was chosen to host the fourth APEC Economic Leaders' Meeting for 1996. As early as 5 December 1994, President Fidel V. Ramos signed Administrative Order No. 160 that created a national commission in preparation for the APEC meetings. The National Organizing Commission (APEC-NOC) was chaired by the Secretary of Foreign Affairs, with the Secretary of Trade and Industry and the Executive Secretary as co-chairs.

Venues
Four Philippine cities were designated as venues for the year-long series of meetings: Subic, Manila, Cebu and Davao. Subic hosted the Economic Leaders' Meeting just four years after it reopened as a free port zone following the closure of the US naval and air force base there due to the 1991 Mount Pinatubo eruption.

To accommodate the delegations of the 18 economic leaders who attended the summit, the government had to build new road, transportation, convention and housing infrastructure. These include Subic Bay International Airport, Subic-Tipo Road and a series of 18 villas along Triboa Bay where each economic leader and its entourage was billeted. The villas alone were reported to have cost around US$1–2 million each and were built on land that used to be an ammunition and explosives dump for the former US bases. It took eight months and 4,000 workers to complete the villas.

In Manila, the Philippine International Convention Center was chosen as venue for the APEC Ministerial Meetings. To shuttle ministers from 18 APEC member economies from their hotel to the convention center, the Metropolitan Manila Development Authority (MMDA) created "Friendship Lanes", two lanes each in four major Metro Manila roads such as Roxas Boulevard for the exclusive use of the delegates' vehicles.

Security
As part of the preparation for the summit, the Philippines strengthened its security force. At least 26,000 police and soldiers were deployed to ensure the security of the delegates and guests. President Ramos assured APEC participants of their security in his speech during the inauguration of Subic Bay International Airport. On 22 November 1996, two days before the Economic Leaders' Summit, the US State Department, through its spokesperson Nicholas Burns, warned American citizens in the Philippines to take security precautions following threats against American diplomats attending the summit.

APEC Economic Leaders' Meeting

Attendees
This was the first APEC meeting for Australian Prime Minister John Howard and Japanese Prime Minister Ryutaro Hashimoto, and was the last APEC meeting for Papua New Guinean Prime Minister Julius Chan and Thai Prime Minister Banharn Silpa-archa.

Results
Individual action plans by member economies were compiled into the Manila Action Plan which had a goal of achieving the Bogor liberation target. The Information Technology Agreement was endorsed by the APEC leaders which was later adopted at the World Trade Organization ministerial meeting in Singapore weeks after the leaders' meeting.

References

1996
1996 in economics
Economic history of the Philippines
Diplomatic conferences in the Philippines
20th-century diplomatic conferences
1996 in international relations
1996 conferences
History of Zambales
1996 in the Philippines
November 1996 events in Asia